Bowyer Island is a small private island in Howe Sound. It comprises Kildare Estates, Bowyer Island Estates, and B and A Estates. It is located east of Bowen Island and Horseshoe Bay. BC Liberal politician, formerly Attorney-General of British Columbia, Geoff Plant is a seasonal resident.

Bowyer Island was named by Capt. George Henry Richards of HMS Plumper between 1857–1861, after Rear-Admiral George Bowyer, (1740–1800), commander of HMS Barfleur during the Glorious First of June (all the names used in Howe Sound are in honour of the battle of the Glorious First of June).

References

South Coast of British Columbia
Islands of British Columbia
Private islands of Canada